Hotel Rooms is a 2013 release from Tyson Illingworth, better known as tyDi. It is a compilation of his non-dance music tracks, some of which had been previously released. The album features the vocals of Tania Zygar, Audrey Gallagher, Kane, Luke Mansini, Carmen Keigans, and Christina Novelli.

Track listing

Release history

References

2013 albums
Armada Music albums